General elections were held in Singapore on 31 August 1991. President Wee Kim Wee dissolved parliament on 14 August 1991 on the advice of Prime Minister Goh Chok Tong. 

The result was a victory for the People's Action Party, which won 77 of the 81 seats while Worker's Party won Hougang SMC and the Singapore Democratic Party retain Potong Pasir SMC and captured Nee Soon Central SMC and Bukit Gombak SMC making it the largest representation for opposition-elect in Parliament and was marked as a second and third SMC won by the Singapore Democratic Party and the first time an opposition claimed multiple SMCs. 

Voter turnout was 95.0%, although this figure represents the turnout in the 25 constituencies to be contested, with PAP candidates earning walkovers in the other 41; this was the second general election, after the 1968, where PAP returned to power on nomination day due to a majority of walkovers; a collaborative effort amongst all the opposition parties headed by Chiam See Tong decided to not contest all seats, so as to reassure voters to vote in ease for the opposition, known as a "by-election effect". This was to date, the only election, where no Non-constituency Member of Parliament seats were offered, as the four seats won by the opposition is more than the minimum number of opposition MPs in Parliament at three.

Background
This was the inaugural election for Prime Minister and current PAP secretary-general Goh Chok Tong after then-Senior Minister Lee Kuan Yew stepped down on 28 November 1990. Goh decided to call a snap election merely three years after the last election to court a fresh mandate, setting Parliament's shortest term ever. 

An unprecedented four seats were won by the opposition, the biggest number since the 1963 election, and its share of votes fell for the third consecutive time since 1984, down to then-lowest share of 61.0%. The Singapore Democratic Party (SDP) had eight out of nine candidates came in among the top ten opposition candidates, with the party added two more spoils to the seat as well as retaining Potong Pasir SMC by leader Chiam See Tong in a record-69.6% vote, clocking in then the best performance for an opposition party at the time of the election at 48.6% of the votes and becoming the main opposition party in Parliament. The Workers' Party of Singapore (WP) made its second in-road into the legislature with the victory of its organizing secretary Low Thia Khiang (who previously contested Tiong Bahru GRC in the last election and Hougang SMC on this election), who would years later become WP secretary-general and leader (2001-2018). All three incumbents who were defeated in the election were one-term MPs including Seet Ai Mee, Ng Pock Too and Tang Guan Seng; only Tang returned to the 1997 election as a member in Ang Mo Kio GRC.

At a post-election press conference on the night of 31 August, Goh glumly attributed the loss to his "open and consultative style of government" and pledged to re-evaluate his style. Since the introduction of the Non-Constituency Member of Parliament scheme in 1984, this was the first (and to date the only) election no NCMP seats were offered since four elected opposition seats exceeded the minimum of three NCMP seats allotted; the narrow defeat of WP's Eunos GRC team, helmed by Lee Siew Choh again, did not see to Lee's return as NCMP as a result. This was Lee's final legislature and electoral presence as he resigned from WP and retired from politics in 1993. The maximum of six Nominated MPs were appointed for this term, up from two Nominated MPs previously. 

During the time where Ong Teng Cheong and Lee Hsien Loong were suffering from cancer, Goh went to call an by-election for his constituency (Marine Parade GRC), citing its best chances of winning for "political self-renewal" to get people of "ministerial calibre" to join the government under PAP, and paving the chance for J. B. Jeyaretnam to participate in the by-election after his ban expiring that year.

Timeline

Electoral boundaries

Existing GRCs
Another group of changes were necessary as it increased from three seats to four. Some of them are in the basis of expansion due to the fast growth of towns. The newer divisions are those because of developments of Simei, Jurong West, Bishan and Pasir Ris respectively. Many existing Single Member Constituencies were either remain intact or absorbed to GRCs, though existing GRCs have also created newer divisions.

New and retiring candidates

Results

By constituency

Notes

References

Singapore
General elections in Singapore
1991 in Singapore
August 1991 events in Asia